The 1973 All-East football team consists of American football players chosen by various selectors as the best players at each position among the Eastern colleges and universities during the 1973 NCAA Division I football season.

Offense

Quarterback
 Tom Parr, Colgate (AP-1)

Running backs
 John Cappelletti, Penn State (AP-1)
 Tony Dorsett, Pittsburgh (AP-1)
 Jim Jennings, Rutgers (AP-1)

Tight end
 Randy Grossman, Temple (AP-1)

Wide receivers
 Danny Buggs, West Virginia (AP-1)

Tackles
 Charlie Getty, Penn State (AP-1)
 Al Krevis, Boston College (AP-1)

Guards
 Dave Lapham, Syracuse (AP-1)
 Mark Markovich, Penn State (AP-1)

Center
 Joe Montgomery, William & Mary (AP-1)

Defense

Ends
 Jim Buckman, Pittsburgh (AP-1)
 Tom Castari, Dartmouth (AP-1)

Tackles
 Randy Crowder, Penn State (AP-1)
 Mike Hartnest, Penn State (AP-1)

Middle guard
 Mike Phillips, Cornell (AP-1)

Linebackers
 Bob Lally, Cornell (AP-1)
 Alex MacLellan, Boston College (AP-1)
 Ed O'Neil, Penn State (AP-1)

Defensive backs 
 Carl Lewis, Yale (AP-1)
 Frank Polito, Villanova (AP-1)
 John Provost, Holy Cross (AP-1)

Key
 AP = Associated Press
 UPI = United Press International

See also
 1973 College Football All-America Team

References

All-Eastern
All-Eastern college football teams